Indrek Meelak (born 10 October 1960 in Tallinn) is an Estonian prosecutor and politician. He was a member of IX Riigikogu representing the Estonian Centre Party.

References

Living people
1960 births
20th-century Estonian lawyers
Estonian Centre Party politicians
Members of the Riigikogu, 1999–2003
University of Tartu alumni
Politicians from Tallinn
Members of the Riigikogu, 2003–2007
21st-century Estonian lawyers